Darisiyeh, also rendered as Dirsiyeh, Dariseh, Darsiyeh, Deriseh, or Drisiyeh, may refer to:
 Darisiyeh-ye Olya
 Darisiyeh-ye Sofla
 Darisiyeh-ye Vosta